People Organized in Defense of Earth and Her Resources (PODER) is an environmental organization based in Austin, Texas.

The organization informs the local community about local environmental issues and previously campaigned against fuel storage near residential areas.

Organization 
People Organized in Defense of Earth and Her Resources is an environmental organization based in East Austin where it serves a low-income community that primarily comprises Black and Mexican-American immigrants.

The organization disseminates information to the local community about local environmental issues.

It was co-founded by Susana Almanza in 1991, in response to her perceptions of increasing pollution in Austin. Almanza is the Executive Director of the organization.

In the 1990s, the organization gathered anecdotal evidence about health conditions of community members in areas where petrochemical companies stored fuel.

The board chair is Janie Rangal.

References

External links 

 Official website

Organizations established in 1991
Environmental organizations based in Texas
Organizations based in Austin, Texas